Timm or TIMM may refer to:

Given name
 Timm Klose (born 1988), Swiss footballer
 Timm Rosenbach (born 1968), American football player and coach
 Timm Sharp (born 1978), American actor

Surname
 Bruce Timm (born 1961), American animator and producer
 Cap Timm (1908–1987), American college baseball coach
 Christian Timm (born 1979), German footballer
 Christopher Timm (born 1968), English cricketer
 David Timm (born 1969), German pianist, organist, choral conductor and jazz musician
 Doug Timm (1960–1989), American composer and conductor
 Georg Wilhelm Timm (1820–1895), Baltic-German artist
 Henry Christian Timm (1811–1892), German-born American pianist, conductor, and composer
 Joachim Christian Timm (1734–1805), German botanist
 Mads Timm (born 1984), Danish footballer
 Otto Timm (1893–1978), American aviator and aircraft manufacturer
 Richard William Timm (1923–2020), American Roman Catholic priest
 Robert D. Timm (1921–2016), American politician and businessman
 Tarmo Timm (born 1936), Estonian zoologist
 Uwe Timm (born 1940), German author
 Uwe Timm (libertarian author) (1932–2014), German author

Other uses
TIMM (TV), a television channel from Germany
Timm Aircraft, a former American aircraft manufacturer
TIMM9, the gene encoding human protein Tim9
TIMM10, the gene encoding human protein Tim10

See also
 Timms, a surname

Surnames from given names